N.O.V.A. 3 (Near Orbit Vanguard Alliance 3) is Gameloft's third installment of the N.O.V.A. series for iOS, BlackBerry 10 and Android devices, with planned releases for the BlackBerry PlayBook and Windows Phone 8 devices. The game was released on the App Store on May 10, 2012. N.O.V.A. 3 is a science fiction action-adventure first-person shooter video game. Gameloft launched a free-to-play edition of N.O.V.A. 3 which is known as N.O.V.A. 3: Freedom Edition. It features Gameloft's multiplayer service Gameloft Live.

Campaign 

Former N.O.V.A commander Kal Wardin receives a distress call from his AI, Yelena, from the long abandoned planet Earth. He crash lands on the city of old San Francisco and joins up with Sergeant Becker and his N.O.V.A squad to fight their way back to the N.O.V.A base, while also disabling a Signal Jammer. A wounded Volterite detonates a bomb which blasts him out of the building. After helping him stand up, Sergeant Becker and his team come to know of his acts of heroism in the events of N.O.V.A. 2. He then heads to the sensor arrays after repairing them and then continues onward to base. At the base, Kal finds out that the N.O.V.A has stolen the Judger's artifact. The artifact could transform Earth back into the habitable planet it once was. But the Judgers were not people to play with, and knowing this, Kal vows that after saving the Judger's artifact from the hands of the notorious Volterites, he would be resigning from N.O.V.A, and this time, permanently.

He and Sergeant Becker ride a 4x4 to the artifact location. As instructed to, Becker gets on the gun of the 4x4 and covers the entrance. Kal manages to reach the artifact, but right next to it stands Prometheus, who forbids him to get the artifact. Prometheus explains he is the hand of the Judgers, and he will be returning the artifact to them.

Prometheus then tells Kal that unsurprisingly, Becker was overpowered and killed by the swarm of Volterites at the entrance. He then explains that Kal will have to retrieve two more artifacts for the Judgers in order to stop them from "cleansing" the world, killing both humans and Volterites in the process. Prometheus also tells him that he will have to get to the Fyna galaxy and battle for the second artifact.

The second artifact is hidden in an ancient Volterite ship, Therrius. Kal is teleported there by Prometheus, and gets the artifact, with the help of new Volterite ally Maz'Rah. In the process, Kal reactivates the ship as well, which would help Maz'Rah's Volterite rebels in their war against the Volterites who are hostile to humans, called the Dominion.

Then, Kal heads to desert planet Boreas, where he works with his old friend Rufus to retrieve the third artifact. However, after fighting off the rebels on Boreas and an intense car chase, the Volterites escape with the artifact and take it to their home planet, Volteron, where they intend to convert the artifact into a weapon of mass destruction to use against the humans.

Kal, Rufus and Yelena then head to Volteron to get the artifact, before the Judgers would intervene and wipe out all traces of humans and Volterites. After fighting through heavy resistance and braving harsh environments including the exploration of a Volterite Shrine, crossing a lava river and much more, they meet Maz'Rah again who leads Kal through some Volterite systems. After that, they head to a Volterite temple where the artifact is located.

Upon reaching the temple, however, Yelena is killed by the temple guardian, a powerful creature called the Kar'Rak. Maz'Rah reveals he can and has been controlling it, telling Kal and Rufus that the Volterite Overseer has left him no choice but to kill them. After Kal and Rufus fight him off while evading the Kar'Rak, Maz'Rah realizes his betrayal and kills the Overseer in a brief fight, and gives Kal the final artifact before dying of the wounds the Overseer had inflicted upon him. Rufus and Kal then escape the temple's destruction with Prometheus, who teleports them out.

Multiplayer
Players can use multiplayer in N.O.V.A. 3 in the following way:
Online (via Gameloft Live)
Note : N.O.V.A. 3 Premium Edition servers are shut down.
However, in some devices like iPod Touch running iOS 5, the Freedom Edition still allows Multiplayer gaming.

Reception 

On Metacritic, the game has an average score of 83 out of 100 based on 21 reviews.

References 

2012 video games
Android (operating system) games
BlackBerry 10 games
Gameloft games
IOS games
IPod games
Science fiction shooter video games
Video games developed in Romania
Windows Phone games